The 1994–95 New Zealand Centenary Tournament was a quadrangular ODI cricket tournament held in February, 1995 to mark the centenary of the establishment of the New Zealand Cricket Council in Christchurch on December 27, 1894. It featured the national cricket teams of South Africa, India, Australia and the hosts New Zealand. The tournament was won by Australia, who defeated the hosts in the final.

Points table

Matches
Using the round robin format, each team played the others once. Australia defeated South Africa in the tournament opener and lost only one match in the whole tournament. Similarly, New Zealand succeeded in its opening match against India and lost only to Australia including in the final.

Final

References

External links
 Series home at ESPN Cricinfo

1994–95 Australian cricket season
1995 in cricket
1995 in New Zealand cricket
Indian cricket seasons from 1970–71 to 1999–2000
International cricket competitions from 1994–95 to 1997
New Zealand cricket seasons from 1970–71 to 1999–2000
One Day International cricket competitions
South African cricket seasons from 1970–71 to 1999–2000